Pyrausta chilialis is a moth in the family Crambidae. It was described by Cajetan von Felder, Rudolf Felder and Alois Friedrich Rogenhofer in 1875. It is found in Chile.

References

Moths described in 1875
chilialis
Moths of South America
Endemic fauna of Chile